The 1939–40 Cupa României was the seventh edition of Romania's most prestigious football cup competition.

The trophy was won by Rapid București after 4 finals, first three was draws. They defeated Venus București.

Format
The competition is an annual knockout tournament with pairings for each round drawn at random.

There are no seeds for the draw. The draw also determines which teams will play at home. Each tie is played as a single leg.

If a match is drawn after 90 minutes, the game goes in extra time, and if the scored is still tight after 120 minutes, there a replay will be played, usually at the ground of the team who were away for the first game.

From the first edition, the teams from Divizia A entered in competition in sixteen finals, rule which remained till today.

The format is almost similar with the oldest recognised football tournament in the world FA Cup.

First round proper

|colspan=3 style="background-color:#FFCCCC;"|8 November 1939

|-
|colspan=3 style="background-color:#FFCCCC;"|12 November 1939

|-
|colspan=3 style="background-color:#FFCCCC;"|18 February 1939

|}

Second round proper

|colspan=3 style="background-color:#FFCCCC;"|27 February 1940

|-
|colspan=3 style="background-color:#FFCCCC;"|6 March 1940

|}

Quarter-finals 

|colspan=3 style="background-color:#FFCCCC;"|16 March 1940

|-
|colspan=3 style="background-color:#FFCCCC;"|17 March 1940

|}

Semi-finals

|colspan=3 style="background-color:#FFCCCC;"|28 April 1940

|}

Final

Replay

Second replay

Third replay

References

External links
 romaniansoccer.ro
 Official site
 The Romanian Cup on the FRF's official site

Cupa României seasons
1939–40 in Romanian football
1939–40 domestic association football cups